The 1920 Toronto Argonauts season was the 34th season for the team since the franchise's inception in 1873. The team finished in first place in the Interprovincial Rugby Football Union with a 5–1 record and qualified for the playoffs. After defeating the Toronto Rowing and Athletic Association in the Eastern Final, the Argonauts lost the 8th Grey Cup to the Toronto Varsity Blues.

Regular season

Standings

Schedule

Postseason
The Argonauts' 7-6 victory over Toronto in the Eastern Final on November 20 was voided by the Canadian Rugby Union on November 23, in response to a formal protest filed by the losing team concerning a scoring decision by the game officials. As a result of the decision to uphold this appeal, the two teams were directed to replay the second half of the game, on November 27, with the score standing at 2-0 in favour of the Argonauts, as it had stood at halftime in the first game.

Grey Cup

December 4 @ Varsity Stadium (Attendance: 10,088)

References

Toronto Argonauts seasons